When Rules Turn Loose (Traditional Chinese: 識法代言人) is a TVB modern drama series broadcast in December 2005.

Though the series backdrop revolves around the court; however, the main theme of the series deals with family bond. It depicts an insight of meaningful values of everyday family life.

Cast

Viewership ratings

References

External links
TVB.com When Rules Turn Loose - Official Website 

TVB dramas
2005 Hong Kong television series debuts
2006 Hong Kong television series endings